St Peter's Church is an Anglican parish church in Devizes, Wiltshire. It is a Victorian church and is situated on the Bath Road, one of four Anglican churches in the town. It is in the Anglican Diocese of Salisbury but is under the Episcopal care of the Bishop of Ebbsfleet. It is also an active member of Devizes Churches Together.

History
St Peter's Church was built when Rev Benjamin Dowding, Vicar of St James's Church, Devizes, decided that the town needed another church that was nearer to the Kennet and Avon Canal and the industries surrounding it.

The foundation stone was laid on 30 June 1865 by Rev Dowding. The construction took from 1865 to 1866 and was built by Slater & Carpenter. The church was consecrated on 24 July 1866 by Walter Kerr Hamilton, Bishop of Salisbury. The consecration service was attended by the Royal Wiltshire Militia who marched to the church with the clergy in procession.

The south aisle and organ chamber were added between 1884 and 1885 by Weaver & Adye.

The first vicar of St Peter's was Rev Harold Grindle. Successive incumbents added to the development of the building and the culture of the parish, notably Canon Frederick Phipps who served for 34 years and introduced the Anglo-Catholic style of worship that continues to this day.

Another former vicar is Rev Douglas Bryant. He was priest of St Peter's for seven years and in that time, he did much to increase the church's devotional atmosphere. He eventually became a Canon of Guildford Cathedral. Bryant's son, Mark Bryant, was until October 2018Bishop of Jarrow and is now an Assistant Bishop in the Diocese of Newcastle.

In more recent years, St Peter's has become an active member of both Forward in Faith and The Society (Church of England), and the PCC have passed Resolutions A, B and C in opposition to the ordination of women as priests. The present Incumbent is The Rev'd. Dr Vincent Perricone, appointed in 2014.

Stations and icons
St Peter's has a hand-carved, wooden collection of Stations of the Cross that decorate the walls of the church. It also has a collection of icons, including one of St Paul and one of St Peter, which was given to the church by a former parishioner, Estelle Holloway.

List of incumbents

Organ

The church has a 2 manual pipe organ by Griffin and Stroud dating from 1898. A specification of the organ can be found on the National Pipe Organ Register.

References

External links
 
 St Peter's entry on the online Anglican churches database 'A Church Near You.'

Church of England church buildings in Wiltshire
Anglo-Catholic church buildings in Wiltshire
Churches completed in 1866
19th-century Church of England church buildings
Saint Peter
1866 establishments in England
Grade II listed churches in Wiltshire
Anglo-Catholic churches in England receiving AEO